The Lockheed CL-1201 was a design study by Lockheed for a giant nuclear-powered transport aircraft in the late 1960s. One  envisioned use of the concept was as an airborne aircraft carrier.

Design 

Had it been built, it would have had the largest wingspan of any airplane to date, and more than twice that of any aircraft of the 20th century.

The wing would be of crescent form, similar to the British Handley Page Victor V-bomber, but unlike the British design, it was tailless.

Power would be derived from the heat generated by a nuclear reactor and transferred to four jet engines near the rear, where it would superheat the air passing through to provide thrust. The craft would be capable of staying airborne for long periods of time, with an estimated endurance of 41 days. At low altitudes, the jets would burn conventional aviation fuel. In order to get airborne in the first place it required 182 additional vertical lift engines.

Two variants were studied, a logistics support aircraft and an airborne aircraft carrier. There was a rumored third variant, but information on such a model has never been made public.

The logistics support variant would have a conventional heavy transport role, carrying hundreds of troops and their equipment at once.

The airborne aircraft carrier would have carried up to 22 fighter aircraft externally and would have an internal dock capable of handling two air-to-ground shuttle transport aircraft.

Specifications 

The design specifications of the CL-1201 were:

 Span: 1,120 feet (341 meter)

 Gross weight: 11.85 million pounds (5375 metric tonnes)

 Endurance: 41 days

 Reactor output: 1830 megawatts

 Crew: 400-845

 Tactical fighters carried (AAC variant): 22                                

 Main engines: 4

 Lift engines: 182

See also 

 Short SB.4 Sherpa

References

External links

 The Lockheed CL-1201 Flying Aircraft Carrier by Tails Through Time in the Internet Archive
 The eccentric engineer: an aviation ostrich destined never to fly. The Institution of Engineering and Technology

Lockheed aircraft
Flying wings
Nuclear-powered aircraft
Cancelled military aircraft projects of the United States
Airborne aircraft carriers